Finn Trond Isaksen (26 April 1924 – 29 September 1987) was a Norwegian politician for the Centre Party who served as Minister of Agriculture from 1983 to 1985.

References

1924 births
1987 deaths
Ministers of Agriculture and Food of Norway